Ravanna is a ghost town in Finney County, Kansas, United States.

History
Ravanna was founded in 1882.

In 1887, it was one of two towns that vied to become the county seat of the now defunct Garfield County, which merged into Finney County in 1893.

The post office in Ravanna closed permanently in 1922.

Geography

Climate
According to the Köppen Climate Classification system, Ravanna has a semi-arid climate, abbreviated "BSk" on climate maps.

References

Further reading

External links
 Finney County Maps: Current, Historic, KDOT

Ghost towns in Kansas
Former populated places in Finney County, Kansas
Former county seats in Kansas